The North Dakota State Treasurer is a political office in North Dakota. The treasurer's duty is to assure sound financial oversight and absolute safety of all public funds collected, managed, and disbursed. The Office of the State Treasurer is separated into five divisions: Administration, Investments, Accounting, Tax Distributions, and Cash Management. The state treasurer is Thomas Beadle, who was elected on November 3, 2020, and took office on January 1, 2021.

See also
List of North Dakota State Treasurers

Notes

External links

Duties of the North Dakota State Treasurer